No Man Knows My History: The Life of Joseph Smith is a 1945 book by Fawn M. Brodie that was one of the first significant non-hagiographic biographies of Joseph Smith, the progenitor of the Latter Day Saint movement. No Man Knows My History was influential in the development of Mormon history as a scholarly field, though historians of Mormonism have since criticized the book for its methodological deficiencies, factual errors, and overt hostility to Smith. 

No Man Knows My History has never been out of print, and 60 years after its first publication, its publisher, Alfred A. Knopf, continues to sell about a thousand copies annually. For a revised edition released in 1971, Brodie added a supplement incorporating psychohistorical commentary. In 1995, Utah State University (USU) marked the 50th anniversary of the book's first publication by hosting a symposium to re-examine the book, its author, and her methods, and in 1996 USU published the symposium papers as a book of essays.

Background
Reared in Utah in a respected, if impoverished, family of Latter-day Saints, Brodie drifted away from religion during her graduate studies in literature at the University of Chicago. Having found temporary employment at the Harper Library, Brodie began researching the origins of Mormonism as a biographical study of Joseph Smith. The writing of the biography was slowed by the birth of her first child and by three rapid moves to follow her husband's career, but in 1943, Brodie entered a 300-page draft of her book in a contest for the Alfred A. Knopf literary fellowship; and in May, the publisher judged her application to be the best of the 44 entries.

Other scholars of Mormonism enlarged and critiqued Brodie's research, most notably Dale Morgan, who became a lifelong friend, mentor, and sounding board. Brodie finally completed her biography of Smith in 1944, and Knopf published it in 1945, when Brodie was 30 years old.

Perspective on Smith
In No Man Knows My History, Brodie presented the young Smith as a good-natured, lazy, extroverted, and unsuccessful treasure seeker, who, in an attempt to improve his family's fortunes, first developed the notion of golden plates and then the concept of a religious novel, the Book of Mormon. This book, she asserts, was based in part on an earlier work, View of the Hebrews, by a contemporary clergyman, Ethan Smith. While previous "naturalistic approaches to Joseph's visions had explained them through psychological analysis", regarding Smith as honest but deluded, Brodie instead interpreted him as having been deliberately deceptive. In No Man Knows My History, Brodie depicts Smith as having been a deliberate impostor, who at some point, in nearly untraceable steps, became convinced that he was indeed a prophet—though without ever escaping "the memory of the conscious artifice" that created the Book of Mormon. Jan Shipps, a preeminent non-LDS scholar of Mormonism who rejects this theory, nevertheless called No Man Knows My History a "beautifully written biography... the work of a mature scholar [that] represented the first genuine effort to come to grips with the contradictory evidence about Smith's early life."

Although Brodie's analysis of Smith has sometimes been termed psychobiography or psychohistory, she did not gain a reputation as a psychohistorian until later in life, and she denied the presence of psychohistory in No Man Knows My History "except by inadvertence." In 1971, Brodie added a supplement to the book that engaged more directly—though still somewhat sparingly—in psychoanalysis, revising her earlier portrayal of Smith from a deliberate charlatan to a conflicted person torn by unconscious internal dissonance in a "personality disorder" that nevertheless defied clinical models.

Reception

Prominence 
Upon its publication, Dale Morgan called Brodie's first book the "finest job of scholarship yet done in Mormon history and perhaps the outstanding biography in several years—a book distinguished in the range and originality of its research, the informed and searching objectivity of its viewpoint, the richness and suppleness of its prose, and its narrative power." For decades afterward, No Man Knows My History enjoyed broad acceptance. In 1971, Latter-day Saint historian Marvin S. Hill observed that at the time, "most professional American historians" regarded the book "as the standard work on the life of Joseph Smith." By 1995, although four other book-length studies of Joseph Smith had been produced, none achieved as much prominence as No Man Knows My History. 

In 1995, Utah State University sponsored a symposium to commemorate the 50th anniversary of the publication of No Man Knows My History during which scholars reflected on the book's contributions to Mormon studies. 

In his 2005 biography of Smith titled Joseph Smith: Rough Stone Rolling, Richard Bushman noted that at that time Brodie's "biography was acknowledged by non-Mormon scholars as the premier study of Joseph Smith," and he called Brodie "the most eminent of Joseph Smith's unbelieving biographers." In 2007, Bushman observed Knopf still sold about a thousand copies of No Man Knows My History annually and noted Brodie had "shaped the view of the Prophet for half a century. Nothing we have written has challenged her domination. I had hoped my book would displace hers, but at best it will only be a contender in the ring, whereas before she reigned unchallenged." However, historian Laurie Maffly-Kipp, who is not Mormon, believed the influence of No Man Knows My History was waning, as while it had been "the 'go to' book on Smith's life" for "most historians", Rough Stone Rolling displaced it as a "definitive account" of Smith.

Criticism 
Upon its 1945 release, one of the book's earliest critics was Vardis Fisher, a prolific novelist and former Latter-day Saint. In his review for the New York Times, Fisher approved of Brodie's "painstaking" work and praised her "excellent analysis of the early appeal of Mormonism," but he was unconvinced of Brodie's theory that Smith was a self-interested fraud and accused her of pursuing the idea overzealously, writing, "she has a thesis, and she rides it hard." Fisher also criticized Brodie's willingness to "give the content of a mind or to explain motives which at best can only be surmised," making No Man Knows My History "almost more a novel than a biography."

Although scholars of American history for decades considered No Man Knows My History the quintessential biography of Joseph Smith, historians of Mormonism were more critical as early as 1945. The book's portrayal of Smith as irreligious was at odds with the spiritual nature of Smith's personal writings, public discourse, and scriptural production, including the Book of Mormon. Additionally, No Man Knows My History claimed people's interest in and conversion to Mormonism was the result of Smith's charisma and a conjectured "unconscious but positive talent at hypnosis." However, attributing conversions to hypnosis and charisma neglected the broader religious context of nineteenth-century America and failed to account for Mormons who converted or stayed committed in Smith's absence. Historian Marvin S. Hill hypothesized that "general cynicism toward religion among many intellectuals" in the 1940s may have prompted Brodie's characterization of Smith. 

Brodie's handling of primary sources also drew criticism. For example, No Man Knows My History references Smith's official history as if it is a primary source written or dictated by him, but historians discovered that most of Smith's official history was actually adapted from other sources, such as the diaries of George A. Smith and Willard Richards, and only rendered by scribes as if it were in Smith's first-person voice. Historians also noted that Brodie had not used any material from the LDS Church archives.

Scholars also echoed Fisher's critique of No Man Knows My History's reliance on unsourced and speculative depictions of historical figures' inner thoughts. Although Brodie's literary style invited reader's to feel sympathy for and identify with people portrayed in the book, critics said it relied on guesswork and sometimes outright invention of what someone may have been thinking or feeling. According to psychologist Charles Cohen, this approach "undercut the history." Brodie's use of psychoanalysis in her 1971 supplement was later considered incomplete and inconsistent with evidence of Smith's positive upbringing and healthy relationships with his parents.

In No Man Knows My History, Brodie hypothesized that Smith had fathered five children through polygamous relationships: Oliver Buell, Orson Washington Hyde, Frank Henry Hyde, John Reed Hancock, and Moroni Pratt. In the 2000s, the Sorenson Molecular Genealogy Foundation, using Y-DNA testing, excluded Smith as the father of Buell, Hancock, and Pratt. Frank Henry Hyde's recorded date of birth precludes Smith's paternity, and whether or not Smith fathered Orson Washington Hyde has neither been proved nor disproved.

At a 1995 USU symposium, scholars praised Brodie's accomplishments but generally agreed that No Man Knows My History made questionable interpretations, misused evidence, and had factual errors.

Influence 
The significance and ground-breaking nature of Brodie's work is generally acknowledged within Mormon studies, and No Man Knows My History influenced the field in several lasting ways. The book "completely demolished", in the words of Jan Shipps, the hypothesis that the Book of Mormon was based on a novel manuscript written by Solomon Spaulding. Brodie also rejected earlier academic hypotheses that Smith was epileptic or paranoid and instead depicted Smith as rational and thoughtful. The interpretation of Smith as possessing all his faculties spread and persisted in scholarly studies of Mormonism. Also significantly, No Man Knows My History raised awareness of Smith's and Mormons' participation in politics and the resultant political dimension of both Mormon and anti-Mormon activities.

No Man Knows My History also contributed to the development of a more open-minded approach to church history among Mormon scholars. Historian Marvin S. Hill urged future scholars to avoid extremes in studies of Joseph Smith and instead find a middle ground between hagiography and cynicism. Roger D. Launius considered the book a turning point from "old" to "new" Mormon history, shifting the field away from polemical supports for or attacks on faith and toward objectively understanding events in a search for truth.

In 1971, Hill wrote:[No Man Knows My History] has had tremendous influence upon informed Mormon thinking, as shown by the fact that whole issues of B.Y.U. Studies and Dialogue have been devoted to considering questions on the life of the Mormon prophet raised by Brodie. There is evidence that her book has had strong negative impact on popular Mormon thought as well, since to this day in certain circles in Utah to acknowledge that one has "read Fawn Brodie" is to create doubts as to one's loyalty to the Church.Other scholars in the history of Mormonism have expressed concern over Brodie's long-lasting influence as unhealthy for the field of Mormon studies. In 1995, Roger D. Launius wrote, "The degree to which Mormon historiography has been shaped by the long shadow of Fawn Brodie since 1945 is both disturbing and unnecessary," and he worried that scholars' preoccupation with either disproving or supporting No Man Knows My History "stunt[ed]" the field by narrowing its focus to topics explored in the book. In 2005, Cohen echoed this concern.

In the years since No Man Knows My History, various historians of Mormonism have posited a range of interpretations of Smith, generally affirming Smith's religiousness. In 1998, non-Mormon Dan Vogel agreed with Brodie that Smith deceived others but posited him as a "pious deceiver" who lied in order to impel people toward repentance and faith in God. In his 2005 book Rough Stone Rolling, historian Richard Bushman, a Mormon, sought to challenge the popularity of No Man Knows My History by studying Smith's cultural context and sympathetically understanding him as an accomplished but contradictory person. In 2014, religious studies scholar Ann Taves, who is not Mormon, proposed a naturalistic model of Smith that nevertheless rejected the idea of fraudulence, instead interpreting Smith as a "skilled perceiver" who, with the assistance of other believers, manifested a new religious reality they mutually and sincerely believed in. In 2020, William L. Davis similarly posed a naturalistic model while still interpreting Smith as sincerely religious without deception.

Mormon responses

The Church of Jesus Christ of Latter-day Saints 
Although No Man Knows My History questioned many common Mormon beliefs and portrayals of Joseph Smith, the work was not immediately condemned by the Church of Jesus Christ of Latter-day Saints (LDS Church), even as the book went into a second printing. In 1946, the Improvement Era, an official periodical of the church, claimed that many of the book's citations arose from doubtful sources and that the biography was "of no interest to Latter-day Saints who have correct knowledge of the history of Joseph Smith." The Church News section of the Deseret News provided a lengthy critique that acknowledged the biography's "fine literary style" but denounced it as "a composite of all anti-Mormon books that have gone before." BYU professor Hugh Nibley wrote a scathing 62-page pamphlet entitled No, Ma'am, That's Not History, asserting that Brodie had cited sources supportive only of her conclusions while conveniently ignoring others. Brodie considered Nibley's pamphlet to be "a well-written, clever piece of Mormon propaganda" but dismissed it as "a flippant and shallow piece." The church formally excommunicated Brodie in June 1946 for apostasy, citing her publication of views "contrary to the beliefs, doctrines, and teachings of the Church."

Reorganized Church of Jesus Christ of Latter Day Saints 
Shortly after the release of No Man Knows My History, leaders of the Reorganized Church of Jesus Christ of Latter Day Saints (RLDS; now called Community of Christ) warned Brodie they would sue her, though the Standard-Examiner describes these as having been "empty threats." Israel A. Smith, president of the RLDS Church at the time, claimed that Brodie's authorship of No Man Knows as a "renegade Mormon, born into a Mormon family" was evidence the LDS Church was "an evil bird that fouls its own nest." In 1966, RLDS scholar and member Robert B. Flanders disapproved of the book's uncritical use of 19th-century anti-Mormon literature and criticized Brodie's "zeal to create the grand and ultimate expose of Mormonism." Nevertheless, Flanders also recognized Brodie's "painstaking" research and considered the book "transitional" in the field shift from "old" to "new" Mormon history because it possessed elements of both.

See also 

 History of Joseph Smith by His Mother
 Joseph Smith–History
 Joseph Smith: Rough Stone Rolling
 Joseph Smith: The Making of a Prophet
 Newell G. Bringhurst

References

Sources 

 

 
 
 

1945 non-fiction books
1945 in Christianity
Alfred A. Knopf books
American biographies
Books about Joseph Smith
Books critical of Mormonism
English-language books
History books about the Latter Day Saint movement
Mormonism-related controversies